Pottsville Armory is a historic National Guard armory located at Pottsville, Schuylkill County, Pennsylvania.  It was built in 1913, and is a brick, "T"-plan building consists of a two-story administration building with a 1 1/2-story, rear drill hall with an arched roof.  It is executed in a combined Romanesque Revival / Late Gothic Revival style. The front elevation features a three-story central tower.

It was added to the National Register of Historic Places in 1991.

The building is currently used as home to the Schuylkill YMCA. schuylkillymca.org

References

Armories on the National Register of Historic Places in Pennsylvania
Romanesque Revival architecture in Pennsylvania
Gothic Revival architecture in Pennsylvania
Infrastructure completed in 1913
Buildings and structures in Schuylkill County, Pennsylvania
1913 establishments in Pennsylvania
National Register of Historic Places in Schuylkill County, Pennsylvania